Joonas Niemelä (born 14 January 1997) is a Finnish ice hockey forward currently playing for Saale Bulls of the German 3. Deutsche Eishockeyliga.

References

External links
 

1997 births
Living people
Espoo Blues players
Finnish ice hockey forwards
Lukko players
Sportspeople from Espoo